Walter Anton Berger (October 10, 1905 – November 30, 1988) was an American professional baseball player, scout and manager. He played in Major League Baseball as an outfielder, most notably as a member of the Boston Braves. He also played for the New York Giants, Cincinnati Reds and the Philadelphia Phillies.

Berger was one of the National League's top sluggers of the early 1930s. In his initial  season he hit 38 home runs, a record for rookies which stood until . He also led the league in home runs and runs batted in in  despite the Braves having the fourth-most losses in MLB history, and went on to become the seventh NL player to hit 200 career home runs. Berger was the National League's starting center fielder in baseball's first All-Star Game.

Early life
Born in Chicago but raised in San Francisco, Berger played third base for Mission High School, sharing the infield with future Hall of Fame shortstop and American League president Joe Cronin, who manned second base.

Professional career
Through , he was one of five players to hit 20 or more home runs in their rookie year before July, along with Albert Pujols (2001), Joc Pederson (2015), Cody Bellinger (2017), and Pete Alonso (2019). Pete Alonso hit 53 in 2019. Berger still shares the record for being the fastest player to hit 20 home runs (51 games), shared with Gary Sánchez (who accomplished the feat on September 27, 2016) and Cody Bellinger (June 19, 2017). Berger batted .310 that season, and his 119 runs batted in were also an NL rookie record, since topped by Albert Pujols in 2001.

Berger made the NL All-Star team in the first four years the game was held (1933–36), starting in the first two. In 1933 he finished third in the Most Valuable Player voting, behind Carl Hubbell and Chuck Klein, after hitting 27 home runs (half the Braves team total), second in the league behind Klein's 28. Of the eighteen players who started the 1934 All-Star Game, Berger is the only player not elected to the Major League Baseball Hall of Fame. In 1935, he led NL outfielders in putouts with 458.

Berger's productiveness was lessened by a shoulder and hand injury during the 1936 season. Berger was traded to the New York Giants in June 1937; his first home run for the team was the 200th of his career. In the 1937 World Series, he made only three pinch-hitting appearances, going hitless. In June 1938 he was traded to the Cincinnati Reds, where he would remain until 1940; his 1939 World Series performance was even more dismal than in 1937, going 0 for 15. He ended his career in 1940 with the Philadelphia Phillies. 

In 1350 games over an 11-season career, Berger posted a .300 batting average (1550-for-5163) with 809 runs, 299 doubles, 59 triples, 242 home runs, 898 RBI, 435 walks, .359 on-base percentage and .522 slugging percentage. Defensively, he recorded an overall .975 fielding percentage playing at all three outfield positions and first base.

Post-playing career
Following his retirement as a player, he was a scout for the New York Yankees and managed their Manchester, New Hampshire, minor league team in 1949.

Berger died of a stroke in Redondo Beach, California, in 1988. He was interred at Inglewood Park Cemetery in Inglewood, California.

See also
 List of Major League Baseball career home run leaders
 List of athletes on Wheaties boxes
 List of Major League Baseball annual runs batted in leaders
 List of Major League Baseball annual home run leaders
 Twin Falls Cowboys

References

Further reading

External links
, or Baseball Almanac

1905 births
1988 deaths
Boston Bees players
Boston Braves players
Burials at Inglewood Park Cemetery
Cincinnati Reds players
Indianapolis Indians players
Major League Baseball center fielders
National League All-Stars
National League home run champions
National League RBI champions
New York Giants (NL) players
New York Yankees scouts
Philadelphia Phillies players
Baseball players from Chicago
Pocatello Bannocks players
Los Angeles Angels (minor league) players
Minor league baseball managers
Baseball players from San Francisco